Papilio mangoura is a species of butterfly in the family Papilionidae. It is endemic to Madagascar. The habitat consists of forests.

References

Sources

Butterflies described in 1875
mangoura
Lepidoptera of Madagascar
Butterflies of Africa
Taxonomy articles created by Polbot
Taxa named by William Chapman Hewitson